Aromatum Chaos is a deep depression, in what is considered chaotic terrain.

The mean depth of the western two-thirds of the Aromatum Chaos depression is about 1.64 km, and the remaining eastern one third of the area, is estimated to be about  km in depth below the rim (using MOLA topography data).

The Aromatum Chaos depression and the neighboring Ravi Vallis outflow channel are thought to have been caused by volcano-ice interactions, involving a combination of dikes and sills, which disrupted the cryosphere underneath the surface. This is thought to have pierced an underground aquifer, resulting in the release of large amounts of water. This in turn caused crustal collapse, which created the Aromatum Chaos depression, and a catastrophic flood event, which formed the Ravi Vallis outflow channel. The flood has been estimated to have lasted between 2 and 10 weeks. For estimates of water flow, such as the water speed, the volume discharge rate, and the minimum total water volume discharged, see the Ravi Vallis page.

Volcano-Ice interactions which took place at Aromatum Chaos, and the resulting catastrophic flood events which formed the neighboring Ravi Vallis outflow channel, are also known to have taken place in other parts of Mars, e.g.; Kasei Valles, and Mangala Valles.

Gallery

See also

 Chaos terrain
 List of areas of chaos terrain on Mars
 Martian chaos terrain
 Outburst flood
 Outflow channels

References 

Margaritifer Sinus quadrangle
Valleys and canyons on Mars
Chaotic terrains on Mars